Parcham (Pashto and) was the name of one of the factions of the People's Democratic Party of Afghanistan, formed in 1967 following its split and led for most of its history by Babrak Karmal and Mohammed Najibullah. The basic ideology of the Parchamites was one of a gradual move towards Islamic socialism in Afghanistan. The Parcham faction supported this idea because they felt that Afghanistan was not industrialized enough to undergo a true proletarian revolution as called for in the Communist Manifesto.

The Parcham faction had more urban based members who belonged to the lower-middle and upper middle classes. Opposed to the more moderate Parchamis were the hardline Stalinist Khalq faction. The Khalq developed a more vigorous line, advocating an immediate and violent overthrow of the government and an establishment of a Stalinist regime. Because of Parcham's links with the Kingdom of Afghanistan, initially wishing to keep the constitutional monarchy intact, it was derisively referred to as the "Royal Communist Party" by their Khalqist rivals.

Many pro-Parcham military officers supported Mohammed Daoud Khan's coup against Mohammed Zahir Shah in 1973. Afterwards a high number of Parchamites held high-ranking jobs in Daoud's cabinet and the Central Committee and dominated the security forces. Parchamites, then in charge of the Ministry of Interior, were alleged to be responsible for the death of Mohammad Hashim Maiwandwal, a conservative anti-communist former Prime Minister. In the next years, Parchamites were systematically purged from Khan's cabinet and then persecuted by his regime.

In 1977, Parcham managed to reconcile with the Khalq faction, and following the Saur Revolution of 1978, many Parchamites were represented in the initial government. Very soon after the revolution however, Parchamites were purged from the government by the hardline leadership of Nur Muhammad Taraki, who strictly opposed their alleged "revisionism", and the regime eventually went into a reign of terror, jailing and executing many Parchamites who were accused of deviating from Marxism-Leninism. The Parcham faction eventually gained power in the country after the overthrowing of Hafizullah Amin in December 1979 by the Soviet Union's Operation Storm-333 intervention, which supported a more moderate and pragmatic leadership. The government under Parcham leader Babrak Karmal nevertheless still struggled to win popularity after the excesses of the Khalqists, and they were now low in numbers following the mass executions committed by the Khalq regime in 1978–1979.

Karmal was replaced by Mohammad Najibullah in 1986 after the Soviet Union voiced discontent about his inability to decisively defeat the Mujahideen, and in June 1990, the Parcham-led PDPA converted itself into the Watan Party of Afghanistan (Homeland Party), with all references to Marxism-Leninism removed from the party's manifesto, instead adopting a uniquely Afghan version of Islamic socialism.

References

Arnold, Anthony Afghanistan's Two-Party Communism: Parcham and Khalq (Histories of Ruling Communist Parties) Hoover Institution / Stanford University. 1983.
Kakar, M. Hasan Afghanistan: The Soviet Invasion and Afghan Response, 1979-1982. University of California Press. 1997.
Rasanayagam, Angelo. Afghanistan: A Modern History. St. Martin's Press. 2005

Factions of the People's Democratic Party of Afghanistan
Political party factions

ru:Парчам